KUBC (580 AM "AM580/FM104.5 KUBC GOLD") is a radio station broadcasting a classic hits format. It previously broadcast a news/talk format for 14 years & previously had been Country, Classic Country, Standards, A/C & Pop. KUBC GOLD is a Classic Hits format programmed from and for Montrose. Core Artists of KUBC GOLD include the Eagles, Michael Jackson, Bruce Springsteen, The Bee Gees, Billy Joel, Chicago & many more. The station is focused musically on the 1970s & '80's, with 75% of the music coming from those 2 decades - the remaining 25% split between the 1960's, '90's & early 2000's. The KUBC GOLD Local personalities: 'Moon In The Morning' with Michael Moon from 5:30am to 9am, Stacy Lynn from 9am to 12 noon, B.G. Carter from 12 noon to 3pm, Tony Dee from 3pm to 6pm & Johnny B from 6pm to 9pm. Otto Mation rounds out the Monday thru Friday line-up, performing from 9pm to 5:30am. Licensed to serve Montrose, Colorado, United States, the station serves the Uncompahgre Valley & can be heard all over western Colorado. The station is owned by Townsquare Media through Townsquare License, LLC. The Vice-President/General Manager & Sales Manager of Cherry Creek Media Montrose is Tony Driskill. Belinda Haddock is the Business Manager & Jim Frank is the Chief Engineer. KUBC GOLD's sister stations are 94 Kix Country & 103-7 The River, The Valley's Hit Music! 

On February 19, 2020, KUBC changed their format from news/talk to classic hits, branded as "KUBC Gold". KUBC is simulcast on FM translator K283CZ 104.5 FM Montrose.

logo
https://www.kubcgold.com/wp-content/uploads/2020/02/KUBC-Gold_300x200.png

References

External links

FCC History Cards for KUBC

UBC
Classic hits radio stations in the United States
Townsquare Media radio stations